Fond du Lac School District is a school district located in Fond du Lac County in the U.S. state of Wisconsin. It currently enrolls about 7,000 students and operates 10 elementary schools, 4 middle schools, and two high schools: Fond du Lac High School and an alternative high school for at-risk students. The district is governed by a seven-person Board of Education elected at large for three-year terms and is administered by a superintendent of schools. The board president is Mark Jurgella, and the superintendent is Dr. Jeffrey Fleig.

Schools

High schools
Fond du Lac High School

Middle schools
Sabish Middle School
Theisen Middle School
Woodworth Middle School

Elementary schools
Chegwin Elementary School
Evans Elementary School 
Lakeshore Elementary School 
Parkside Elementary School 
Pier Elementary School 
Riverside Elementary School 
Roberts Elementary School
Rosenow Elementary School 
Waters Elementary School

Alternative and charter schools
STEM Academy
Fondy Central (Alternative High School)

Former schools
Goodrich High School was the high school for the Fond du Lac School District from 1922 to 2001, when the current building was built. Since 2001 the building has been used as Riverside Elementary, and district offices. It also is still the location of the aquatic center, and Fruth Memorial Field, the home football field for the Fond du Lac Cardinals, and formerly, the St. Mary's Springs Ledgers.

Franklin School has been converted to a building for the STEM Academy and Institute.

References

External links 
Fond du Lac School District School Site

School districts in Wisconsin
Fond du Lac, Wisconsin
Education in Fond du Lac County, Wisconsin